The Hiroshima Peace Culture Foundation was established in April 1998 by the City of Hiroshima to promote peace, and to consolidate the city's activities in peace promotion, globalization, and international cooperation. It integrates with the Hiroshima International Relations Organization.

External links
 Hiroshima Peace Culture Foundation

Organizations based in Hiroshima prefecture
Culture in Hiroshima

de:Friedensmuseum Hiroshima
nl:Het museum Hiroshima van de vrede
ja:広島平和記念資料館